Dalmanerea is an Argentine rock band, formed in early 2000s by former members of the Olavarría's band Disculpen al Nono, which at that time were scattered among Buenos Aires, Tandil and Olavarria.

Dalma's music mixed various styles (rock, electronic, pop, alternative, punk, techno, rap, disco, metal, and others) in what has been named meZKla argentina
 
In their shows, the band offers a powerful sound, a well balanced power-rock base with strong electronic support, continuous interactivity with the public, and some humorous licenses.

Dalmanerea has five own production albums ("Dalmademox", "Mundo Guz-Kar", "Falta de medicamentos", "Diván de Historias", "Bomba!", and the 2022 released "#pornopop"), several singles, participation in some collectives albums with others indie bands, and numerous tours on the alternative circuits of the country. Also, the band publish a mystique-of-the-band comic (Dalmaworld) followed by a lot of readers, initiated by Cyvorg and continuated by Leee-O, two great Argentinian graphic-artists.

The current version (7.5) is formed by Lex-Loro on lead guitar (and legal advisor), Betolon playing drums, the bass hero Guzza2K, DJ-RickYMendó (deejaying), Petrungaro-I (voices and percussion), and the singer and extreme-dancer Varmando. Song-writing and lyrics composition are shared by all members.

Team is complemented according to the occasion with the prestigious talents of The-White-Monk (music/video production and recording engineering), iVannette (bass and knowledge base), La-Sombra-Enmascarada (trumpet), AndreYta (voices), Caroluisa (voices), Dr-Satan (guitar and psycho-spiritual guide), Ama-Ly (violin and love, lot of love), Leeo-X (graphics and consulting), Polbatmandeluxe (graphic design and social media support), and the electronic inspiration of the PlayGround duo (Coolo + Tony_GL)

Past versions were v1.0 (Guitar: Cyvorg + Drums/bass: Betolon + Bass/Drums/Voice: Varmando), v1.5 (1.0 + Guitar: Tony_GL), v2.0 (Guitar: Tony_GL + Drums/Bass: Betolon + Bass/Drum: Varmando), v2.5 (2.0 + Bass: Rode-T), v3.0 (Bass: iVannette + Guitar: Tony_GL + Drums: Betolon + Voice: Varmando), v3.5 (3.0 + Guitar: Lex-Loro), v4.0 (3.5 - Tony_GL + 2nd Guitar: Luk-As), v4.5 (4.0 + 2nd Voice: AndreYta + Trumpet/Choirs: Pole-T), v4.6 (4.5 - Lex-Loro + 2nd Guitar: Pole-T),  v5.0 (Guitar/Chorus: Luk-As, 2nd Guitar/2nd Voice: Pole-T, Drums: Betolon, Bass: Ivannette), v5.1 (v5.0 - Luk-As + Guitar: Dr-Satan), 6.0 (Lex, Petrun, Betolon, Guzza and Varmando), and 7.0 (the missing link)

Discography
"Bomba!", 2019, meZKla records, El Cirko Sello Digital, Estudios Kimono, Ovie Mastering

"Divan de Historias", 2018, meZKla records, El Cirko Sello Digital, Gatonegro Studio

"Falta de Medicamentos", 2016, meZKla Records, El Cirko Sello Digital, Gatonegro Studio

"Mundo Guz-Kar", 2008, meZKla Records, Studiorec

"Dalmademox", 2006, meZKla Records, Cyvorgstudio

El Colectivo III, 2004, Discos Colectivo

El Colectivo II, 2003, Discos Colectivo

Interviews
 Luz,  Cámara, Rock - Cultura Infernal TV - 2021
 ¿Cuál es tu Rock? - Radio Tú - 2018
 Rock en Las venas - FM Open 99.3 - 2010
Mutantes en la Noche - FM La Tribu 88.7 - 2009
26 Noticias - TV and Web - 2007
El Popular newspaper - 2005

References 
Clarin Espectaculos
Bio Rock.com.ar
El Bondi
El Telescopio
Reverbnation
Soundclick

External links
Dalmaweb
Fanpage
Album/Falta de Medicamentos
Album/Mundo Guz-Kar

Argentine rock music groups
Rock en Español music groups
Musical groups established in the 2000s